Álvaro Monteiro Magalhães (born 3 January 1961), known simply as Álvaro, is a Portuguese former footballer who played as a left back, and a current manager.

He amassed Primeira Liga totals of 224 matches and six goals over 11 seasons, mainly with Benfica with which he spent nine years, winning ten major titles.

Álvaro represented Portugal at the 1986 World Cup and Euro 1984. In 1994, he began working as a coach.

Club career
Born in Lamego, Viseu District, Álvaro made his Primeira Liga debut in 1980 with Académica de Coimbra, moving subsequently to S.L. Benfica. After two seasons he became first choice, helping the Lisbon club to four leagues and as many domestic cups (three consecutive in the latter competition) while amassing more than 200 official appearances.

In June 1990, after only 13 games in his last two seasons combined – Benfica also appeared in two European Cup finals during that timeframe, but he was only a fringe player – Álvaro left and signed with neighbours C.F. Estrela da Amadora, helping the team to the second round of the UEFA Cup Winners' Cup; however, the league ended in relegation. He closed out his career at the age of 32 in the second division, with Leixões SC.

One year after retiring, Magalhães began a coaching career, working with several first and second level teams. His first experience in the former tier was with G.D. Chaves in 1997–98, narrowly avoiding relegation.

From 2003 to 2005, Magalhães was assistant manager at Benfica under José Antonio Camacho and Giovanni Trapattoni respectively, winning the league title in the second season. In the latter years of the decade he had spells in Romania and Angola, being Girabola champion in the latter country with G.D. Interclube, the second time in the Luanda club's history.

Magalhães penned a new two-year contract in November 2009 but, on 29 March 2011, he was relieved of his duties. In early February 2012, he was appointed coach of fellow league side Clube Nacional de Benguela; shortly after, however, he returned to his country, signing with Associação Naval 1º de Maio which he had already managed in 2005–06's top flight and 2002–03's second tier.

International career
Álvaro was capped 20 times for Portugal, his debut coming on 16 December 1981 in a 2–5 defeat with Bulgaria, a friendly match. He was picked for the squads present at UEFA Euro 1984 and the 1986 FIFA World Cup.

After the infamous Saltillo Affair in the latter tournament, Álvaro was one of the few players that did not defect from the national team, and his last international appearance came on 16 November 1988 in a 1–0 win against Luxembourg for the 1990 World Cup qualifiers, in Porto.

Personal life
Magalhães was born with polydactylism in his left hand, and was nicknamed Seis dedos (six fingers) due to this condition.

Honours

Player
Benfica
Primeira Liga: 1982–83, 1983–84, 1986–87, 1988–89
Taça de Portugal: 1982–83, 1984–85, 1985–86, 1986–87
Supertaça Cândido de Oliveira: 1985, 1989
Taça de Honra (1)
European Cup runner-up: 1987–88, 1989–90
UEFA Cup runner-up: 1982–83

Manager
Interclube
Girabola: 2010

References

External links

1961 births
Living people
People from Lamego
Portuguese footballers
Association football defenders
Primeira Liga players
Liga Portugal 2 players
Associação Académica de Coimbra – O.A.F. players
S.L. Benfica footballers
C.F. Estrela da Amadora players
Leixões S.C. players
Portugal under-21 international footballers
Portugal international footballers
UEFA Euro 1984 players
1986 FIFA World Cup players
Portuguese football managers
Primeira Liga managers
Liga Portugal 2 managers
C.D. Santa Clara managers
G.D. Chaves managers
Gil Vicente F.C. managers
Vitória S.C. managers
C.F. Estrela da Amadora managers
Associação Naval 1º de Maio managers
S.C. Olhanense managers
C.D. Feirense managers
G.D. Interclube managers
C.D. Tondela managers
S.C. Farense managers
FC Gloria Buzău managers
Liga I managers
Portuguese expatriate football managers
Expatriate football managers in Romania
Expatriate football managers in Angola
Portuguese expatriate sportspeople in Romania
Portuguese expatriate sportspeople in Angola
Sportspeople from Viseu District